Tim Cindric (born 1968) is the President of Team Penske. A native of Indianapolis, he is an alumnus of Rose-Hulman Institute of Technology, where he was a four-year basketball letterman in 1990. Cindric served as the Team Manager for Team Rahal from 1994 to 1999, before joining Penske in October 1999. He was promoted to the position of president at Penske Racing in January 2006. He also serves as strategist for the Penske-owned IndyCar teams of Will Power (through 2016) and Josef Newgarden (from 2017). His teams won the IndyCar championship for the 2014, 2017 and 2019 seasons.

His son Austin won the 2022 Daytona 500 and previously raced in the Continental Tire Sports Car Challenge and Pirelli World Challenge, ARCA, and several NASCAR racing series. Austin  currently races in the NASCAR Cup Series full-time for Team Penske, and was one of 5 drivers (along with Brad Keselowski, Joey Logano, Ryan Blaney and Sam Hornish Jr.) to help Team Penske win the Xfinity Series Owner's Championship in 2017. In addition, Austin drove for Penske driver Keselowski's Brad Keselowski Racing full-time in the Camping World Truck Series in 2017.

References

1968 births
Auto racing crew chiefs
IndyCar Series people
Sportspeople from Indianapolis
Rose–Hulman Institute of Technology alumni
Living people

Team Penske